Marian "Miriam" Steever of Chicago, Illinois, was an amateur tennis player in the early part of the 20th century.

Steever paired with Carrie Neely to reach the doubles final at the 1908 U.S. National Championships (now known as the U.S. Open). Steever also reached the fourth round in singles at the U.S. Nationals in 1916.

In 1910 at the Cincinnati Masters, Steever won the singles title and was a doubles finalist (with Dr. Jane Craven).

Steever's other achievements on the tennis court included these:

Western Championships: 
doubles titlist in 1907 
doubles titlist in 1916 (with Mary K. Voorhees)
singles semifinalist in 1915
 
Illinois State Championships:
singles titlist in 1909 and 1910
singles finalist in 1912
doubles titlist in 1910 (with Carrie Neely)
doubles winner in 1914 (with Mrs. CN Beard)
mixed doubles titlist in 1910 (with J.J. Forstall)

Bi-State Championship (Kentucky & Ohio): 
doubles finalist in 1910 (with Mrs. C.N. Beard)

Ohio State Championships: 
doubles titlist in 1910 (with Jane Craven)
mixed doubles finalist in 1910 (with Dr. Lee)

Niagara-in-the-Lake: 
doubles finalist in 1910 (with Jane Craven)
mixed doubles winner in 1910 (with Hoerr)

Delaware State Championships: 
singles semis and doubles quarters (with Taylor) in 1916

Grand Slam finals

Doubles (1 runner-up)

References

Spaulding Lawn Tennis Annuals: 1908, 1909, 1910, 1913, 1915, 1916 & 1917

American female tennis players
Tennis players from Chicago
Year of death missing
Year of birth missing